The 176th Ohio Infantry Regiment, sometimes 176th Ohio Volunteer Infantry (or 176th OVI) was an infantry regiment in the Union Army during the American Civil War.

Service
The 176th Ohio Infantry was organized at Camp Chase in Columbus, Ohio August 10 through September 21, 1864, and mustered in for one year service on September 21, 1864, under the command of Colonel Edwin Cooley Mason.

The regiment was attached to Post and Defenses of Nashville, Department of the Cumberland, to December 1864. 2nd Brigade, 4th Division, XX Corps, Department of the Cumberland, to March 1865. District of Nashville, Tennessee, Department of the Cumberland, to June 1865.

The 176th Ohio Infantry mustered out of service June 18, 1865, at Nashville, Tennessee.

Detailed service
Left Ohio for Nashville, Tennessee, September 21. Served provost and guard duty at Nashville, September 1864 to June 1865. Battle of Nashville December 15–16, 1864.

Casualties
The regiment lost a total of 102 enlisted men during service, all due to disease.

Commanders
 Colonel Edwin Cooley Mason
 Lieutenant Colonel William B. Nesbitt - commanded at the battle of Nashville

See also

 List of Ohio Civil War units
 Ohio in the Civil War

References
 Dyer, Frederick H. A Compendium of the War of the Rebellion (Des Moines, IA:  Dyer Pub. Co.), 1908.
 Ohio Roster Commission. Official Roster of the Soldiers of the State of Ohio in the War on the Rebellion, 1861–1865, Compiled Under the Direction of the Roster Commission (Akron, OH: Werner Co.), 1886–1895.
 Reid, Whitelaw. Ohio in the War: Her Statesmen, Her Generals, and Soldiers (Cincinnati, OH: Moore, Wilstach, & Baldwin), 1868. 
Attribution

External links
 Ohio in the Civil War: 176th Ohio Volunteer Infantry by Larry Stevens
 National Colors of the 176th Ohio Infantry
 Regimental Colors of the 176th Ohio Infantry

Military units and formations established in 1864
Military units and formations disestablished in 1865
Units and formations of the Union Army from Ohio
1864 establishments in Ohio